Golightly-Dean House is a historic home located near Spartanburg, Spartanburg County, South Carolina.  The oldest section dates before 1784. It is the one-story, double-pen, masonry wing. About 1830, the two-story, brick portion of the house was added. Following an 1884 tornado, further modifications were made to the dwelling. Located on the property are a contributing log smokehouse and a log shed.

It was listed on the National Register of Historic Places in 1988.

References

Houses on the National Register of Historic Places in South Carolina
Houses completed in 1830
Houses in Spartanburg County, South Carolina
National Register of Historic Places in Spartanburg, South Carolina
1830 establishments in South Carolina